Tyrosine-protein phosphatase non-receptor type 4 is an enzyme that in humans is encoded by the PTPN4 gene.

Function 

The protein encoded by this gene is a member of the protein tyrosine phosphatase (PTP) family. PTPs are known to be signaling molecules that regulate a variety of cellular processes including cell growth, differentiation, mitotic cycle, and oncogenic transformation. This protein contains a C-terminal PTP domain and an N-terminal domain homologous to the band 4.1 superfamily of cytoskeletal-associated proteins. This PTP has been shown to interact with glutamate receptor delta 2 and epsilon subunits, and is thought to play a role in signalling downstream of the glutamate receptors through tyrosine dephosphorylation.

Interactions 

PTPN4 has been shown to interact with GRID2.

References

Further reading

External links